Traron was a town of ancient Troad, on the Hellespont. Tzetzes mentions a mountain so named, also in the Troad, with which the town may be connected.

References

Populated places in ancient Troad
Former populated places in Turkey